Joan Haythorne (12 April 1915 – 27 August 1987) was a British actress.

Joan Haythorne was born Joan Haythornthwaite, on 12 April 1915, London and died 27 August 1987, Richmond on Thames, Surrey.

Her son was the screenwriter Jeremy Paul.

Selected filmography
 School for Secrets (1946)
 Highly Dangerous (1950)
 Svengali (1954)
 The Weak and the Wicked (1954)
 The Feminine Touch (1956)
 Dry Rot (1956)
 Three Men in a Boat (1956)
 The Shakedown (1959)
 So Evil, So Young (1961)
 Very Important Person (1961)

Selected television
 Richard the Lionheart (1961–62)
 Justice - To Help an Old School Friend - Laura (1971)
 Thriller (1974)
 Hadleigh (1976)

References

External links
 94259

1915 births
1987 deaths
British stage actresses
British film actresses
British television actresses
20th-century British actresses
People from Richmond, London
Alumni of RADA